Sruthy Sasidharan is an Indian playback singer and voice-over artist. She sings in Malayalam, Tamil, Kannada, Telugu, Marathi and Hindi.

Personal life

Sruthy Sasidharan was born in Kozhikode, Kerala. She did her schooling in Calicut and in Malappuram. She received her initial classical training from Baburaj and later continued her training with Krishnakumar from Kerala. She did school education at NSS High school Manjeri and completed plus two at GBHSS Manjeri. She started performing in TV channels and radio at 
a young age and participated in state and national level youth festival. She attended College of Engineering, Trivandrum and graduated her Computer Science Engineering in 2015. She is married to Deepak Sunil and is now settled in the U.S. She has a younger brother.

Career
While pursuing her career in engineering she continued to perform in concerts. She later left her job to pursue her passion in music. She first started her career by singing for various ad films including Bhima Jewellers and giving backing vocals for back score for some movies.  Sruthy stepped into the world of playback singing with the song "Kiya kiva" from the movie Akashamittayi (Malayalam). She continued her work in Malayalam movies with Mayillla Njan from Queen for Jakes Bejoy, "Nenjil" from the movie "Ikkayude shakadam" for Charles Nazerath.  Her song "Kadhale" for Sushin Shyam from the movie "Maradona" topped the charts and brought her many award nominations and wider recognition. She then started to sing for other languages too. In Tamil, her song "Nee en", featuring Charu Hassan, for the movie "Dhadha 87", with the music director Leander Lee Marthy.  She also sung in a couple of Kannada movies like "Chanaksha", and also in Marathi movies.

Filmography

References

1993 births
Living people